Mindanao State University – General Santos City (MSU-GSC or MSU Gensan) is a state university based in General Santos, Philippines. The Mindanao State University–General Santos was created six years after the establishment of the Mindanao State University Main Campus Marawi City on September 1, 1961. It is one of the state universities of the Philippines with the aim of providing education for the different strategic locations across the island of Mindanao. It is a member of the Mindanao State University System.

The MSU is the only state university in the Philippines with the special mandate of integrating the cultural communities in Mindanao into the mainstream of the nation's socio-cultural and political life by providing them with opportunities for quality and relevant public education for their self-development and providing trained manpower skills and technical know-how for the economic development of the region.

History
Starting as a Community High School in 1967, MSU-GSC grew into a junior college in 1971, but was then just limited to a two-year collegiate General Education Program. With a strong clamor from the studentry and the community and all-out support from its constituents for the offering of complete degree programs, the Board of Regents was prompted to study the potential of the college for academic expansion especially when the "feeder" concept was challenged. By virtue of BOR Resolution No. 822, MSU Community College became a full-fledged unit and integral part of the MSU System.

The campus underwent series of transfers as part of its continuing growth and expansion. As a Community High School, it was a "squatter" at an area inside the Dadiangas West Elementary School campus. Engr. Abedin Limpao Osop, the first Chancellor (who was then the Director) of the campus was able to acquire a  lot as a donation from city government. It gave the impetus for the offering of various College degree programs. Later, the acquisition of a  area in Tambler (now in Bgy. Fatima) enabled MSU-GSC to strengthen its functions in instruction research and extension, subsequently affirming the significant role it plays within its areas of coverage. Concrete proofs of this are the establishment of its Research and Development Center & Office of Extension Services, and in the growth of its various colleges: Agriculture, Fisheries, Business Administration & Accountancy, Engineering, Education, Natural Sciences & Mathematics, Social Science and Humanities and its College of Law (extension classes of the main campus). Moreover, it has also opened two advanced education degree programs, the Master in Public Administration and Master of Arts in education (MAEd) as a response to a popular demand articulated by Socsksargen public administrators and academicians.

The university recently became a new member of the Accrediting Agency of Chartered Colleges and Universities in the Philippines (AACCUP) with its programs in Bachelor of Science in Elementary and Secondary Education in candidate status for accreditation as of December 31, 2014.

Academics
MSU Gensan is composed of nine colleges, the College of Medicine, College of Law (an extension of MSU Marawi), College of Agriculture, College of Business Administration and Accountancy, College of Education, College of Engineering, College of Fisheries, College of Natural Sciences and Mathematics, and College of Social Sciences and Humanities; a graduate school (School of Graduate Studies), Senior High School Department and a laboratory high school (College of Education Training Department).
The university also hosts MAED extension program in Sultan Kudarat. This is part of the university's mission to integrate the cultural minorities into public education.

Recently, the Commission on Higher Education recognized the university as a Center of Excellence in Fisheries; as Provincial Institute for Agriculture; and as Center of Training in Education.

Admission
All freshmen applicants should take and pass the Mindanao State University System Admission and Scholarship Examination (SASE).

Notable alumni
 Melisa Cantiveros – Actress and comedian

References

External links
 
 MSU - Main Campus Official website 
 MSU - Naawan Campus Official Website

State universities and colleges in the Philippines
Mindanao State University
Universities and colleges in General Santos